Lake Creek is a stream in Calhoun and Pocahontas counties, Iowa, in the United States. It is a tributary of the North Raccoon River.

Lake Creek was named from the fact it flowed from a lake.

See also
List of rivers of Iowa

References

Rivers of Calhoun County, Iowa
Rivers of Pocahontas County, Iowa
Rivers of Iowa